The Dogwood Stakes is a Grade III American Thoroughbred horse race for three-year-old fillies run over a distance of seven furlongs held annually in late May or early June at Churchill Downs racetrack in Louisville, Kentucky.

History

The event was inaugurated on 8 June 1975 and was won by the favorite My Juliet who would later the following year win Eclipse Award for Outstanding Sprint Horse.

The event is named after a hardy, blooming tree known as the Dogwood, that adds so much beauty to the spring landscape in Kentucky.

The Dogwood Stakes was run in two divisions in 1981.

The event was upgraded to Grade III in 1998.  However, the event lost this classification for the 2016 running and was a Listed event. The event regained its Grade III status in 2020. 
The 2019 winner Covfefe, would later win the Breeders' Cup Filly & Mare Sprint and become champion female sprinter and champion 3-year-old filly.

Distances
Since its inauguration in 1975, the race has been contested at a variety of distances:

 7 furlongs : 1975–1981, 2013 to present
  miles : 1982, 1986–2005
 1 mile : 2006–2012
  miles : 1983–1985

Records
Speed records
 7 furlongs: 1:22.28 – Four Graces  (2020)
 1 mile: 1:34.56 – Acoma (2008)
  miles: 1:42.73 – Take Charge Lady (2002)

Margins: 
 8 lengths – Covfefe  (2019)

Most wins by a jockey
 4 – Larry Melancon (1982, 1984, 1994, 1996)
 4 – Pat Day (1983, 1989, 1997, 1998)

Most wins by a trainer
 5 – D. Wayne Lukas (1989, 1990, 1991, 1993, 2004)

Most wins by an owner
 2 – Claiborne Farm (1983, 1992)
 2 – Overbrook Farm (1989, 1990)
 2 – John C. Oxley (1995, 2005)
 2 – LNJ Foxwoods (2015, 2019)
 2 – Winchell Thoroughbreds (2009, 2022)

Winners

See also
List of American and Canadian Graded races

References

1975 establishments in Kentucky
Churchill Downs horse races
Flat horse races for three-year-old fillies
Graded stakes races in the United States
Recurring sporting events established in 1975
Grade 3 stakes races in the United States